The 1883 Iowa gubernatorial election was held on October 9, 1883. Incumbent Republican Buren R. Sherman defeated Democratic nominee L. G. Kinne with 50.15% of the vote.

General election

Candidates
Major party candidates
Buren R. Sherman, Republican
L. G. Kinne, Democratic 

Other candidates
James B. Weaver, Greenback

Results

References

1883
Iowa